Proofs of Genius: Collected Editions From the American Revolution to the Digital Age is a 2015 book by Amanda Gailey. The book explores collected editions and how they impact American literature and the cultural landscape. Gailey is an associate professor in the English department at University of Nebraska–Lincoln.

References 

2015 non-fiction books
Free ebooks
University of Michigan Press books